The West Lancashire Yacht Club 24 Hour Race, has always been more commonly known as the Southport 24 Hour Race.

The race is a national endurance race for classic sailing dinghies (Enterprise, GP14, Lark and Firefly) held in Southport, Merseyside, England. and is organised by the West Lancashire Yacht Club.

The race, now in its 54th year, has a long history and has always been held in September, with the 2021 24 Hour Race taking place over the weekend of 11/12 September. The race was not sailed in the year 2000 due to the fuel crisis and again in 2020 due to the Covid 19 Pandemic. An early race in the mid 1980s was abandoned during the night because of the fierce weather conditions.

The average turnout, which has stabilised in recent years, is between 60 and 70 boats, although the 50th anniversary race  held in 2016 attracted 82 entries.  Recent entry numbers have been held up by the fact that many of the competing clubs now enter two, three or even four teams.

The race starts at 12 noon on the Saturday. The competing teams then race their dinghies around the marine lake (a man made feature containing 2 islands and an interesting, concrete jetty on the eastern side) for the next 24 hours, finishing at noon on Sunday. Most entries are teams of up to 12 crew members. The crews take turns to sail their dinghy in the race. The crews are not permitted to sail in more than one team during the event. However, there is nothing (other than exhaustion) to prevent a crew of two from sailing the whole event in one boat, 2 people sailing non stop was successfully sailed by Adam McGovern and Chris Robinson of Hollingworth Lake Sailing Club in the 2007 race.

As with all sailing events, weather is the important element. The other important feature of the 24 hour race is the lack of light at night. During the hours of darkness, the helm and crew of each dinghy must keep watch for other boats (often capsized) and the curious concrete jetty mentioned earlier. Colliding with one or the other can be very dangerous and may even cause the team to abandon further participation in the event.

           Southport 24 Hour Race  -  2017 Final Results
                                                              Avg PYS
                                                       Net    Lap Time
Posn     Team Name                       Sail No      Laps    (mm:ss)
1      South Staffs S.C. (A)            GP   13417    86.75    16:36
2      South Staffs S.C. (B)            LK   2529     88.00    16:40
3      Budworth S.C. (A)                GP   Budw A   86.00    16:50
4      Bolton S.C. (A)                  GP   14187    86.00    16:53
5      West Lancs Y.C. (A) (M)          EN   22310    85.00    17:00
6      The Chase S.C. (A)               GP   11       85.00    17:04
7      West Lancs Y.C. (B)              GP   14150    84.75    17:04
8      Staunton Harold S.C.             GP   13300    85.00    17:04
9      Midland S.C. (A)                 GP   14003    85.00    17:05
10     Sligo Y.C.                       GP   14132    83.75    17:13
11     Pilkington S.C. (A)              EN   23121    83.00    17:15
12     Southport S.C.                   GP   SSC      84.00    17:18
13     Plymouth University S.&P.C. (A   EN   17447    81.00    17:46
14     Bolton S.C. (B)                  GP   Jeans    81.00    17:47
15     Chester S & C.C. (A) (M)         EN   22536    80.75    17:48
16     Budworth S.C. (B) (M)            GP   Budw B   81.00    17:53
17     Leigh & Lowton S.C. (A)          EN   23221    80.00    17:53
18     West Oxfordshire S.C. (B)        FF   4115     77.00    17:58
19     Bassenthwaite S.C.               EN   22159    80.00    18:02
20     West Oxfordshire S.C. (A)        EN   WOSC 1   79.00    18:13
21     National Firefly Association     FF   3318     74.75    18:30
22     Midland S.C. (B)                 GP   14045    78.00    18:31
23     Killington S.A.                  EN   22816    77.00    18:35
24     Burwain S.C.                     EN   22499    77.00    18:38
25     Glossop S.C.                     GP   13143    77.00    18:40
26     Birmingham University S.C.       FF   3992     73.00    18:45
27     Midland S.C. (C)                 EN   22901    76.50    18:46
28     Royal Windermere Y.C. (A)        GP   RWYC     76.75    18:49
29     Hoylake S.C. (M)                 EN   20860    76.00    18:54
30     South Staffs S.C. (C)            GP   13705    76.00    18:59
31     Toddbrook S.C. (A)               EN   2232     75.75    19:02
32     Leigh & Lowton S.C. (B)          GP   13654    75.75    19:05
33     Liverpool Y.C. (A) (M)           EN   23383    75.00    19:13
34     South Staffs S.C. (D)            GP   13794    74.75    19:18
35     Budworth S.C. (C)                GP   Budw C   74.75    19:21
36     Chester S & C.C. (B)             EN   23382    74.00    19:25
37     Earlswood Lakes S.C.             EN   15709    73.75    19:27
38     Nottingham University S.C.       FF   4195     70.00    19:35
39     Elton S.C. (B)                   EN   22476    72.50    19:44
40     The Chase S.C. (B)               EN   19011    71.75    19:54
41     Covenham S.C. (A)                EN   20004    71.75    19:54
42     Covenham S.C. (B)                EN   20055    72.00    20:00
43     Errwood S.C.                     EN   12483    72.00    20:01
44     Pilkington S.C. (B)              EN   2312     72.00    20:02
45     Bolton S.C. (C)                  EN   22344    72.00    20:04
46     Rudyard Lake S.C.                EN   RLSC     70.00    20:23
47     Aldridge S.C.                    GP   13944    69.75    20:36
48     Sedbergh School                  LK   2298     69.75    20:48
49     South Shields S.C.               EN   K2400    68.75    20:48
50     Elton S.C. (A) (M)               EN   20400    68.50    20:54
51     Ulley S.C.                       EN   22824    68.00    21:01
52     Plymouth University S.&P.C. (B   FF   3796     65.50    21:10
53     West Lancs Y.C. (C)              GP   12856    67.75    21:12
54     Rossendale Valley S.C.           FF   3675     63.75    21:31
55     Bath University S.C.             FF   3943     63.00    21:41
56     Queen Mary S.C.                  GP   9763     65.50    22:02
57     Jumbles S.C.                     EN   22505    64.75    22:03
58     Manchester University S.C.       FF   3434     62.00    22:09
59     Crosby Scout & Guide M.C.        GP   13918    63.75    22:29
60     Lancaster University S.C.        EN   23194    61.00    23:30
61     Sheffield Hallam University S.   EN   21344    60.00    23:44
62     Liverpool Y.C. (B)               EN   643      56.75    25:16
63     Etherow Country Park S.C.        EN   23196    22.00    64:28

References

External links
West Lancashire Yacht Club: 24 Hour Race
Online TV Program about the 24 Hour Race

Sailing competitions in the United Kingdom
Sport in Southport